Marlborough is a stop on the Luas light-rail tram system in Dublin, Ireland.  It opened in 2017 as a stop on Luas Cross City, an extension of the Green Line through the city centre from St. Stephen's Green to Parnell or Broombridge. It is located on Marlborough Street north of the junction with Abbey Street and provides access to Saint Mary's Pro-Cathedral.

Location and interchange
Marlborough's single platform is located to the east of the tracks, integrated into the pavement. It is a stop on the one-way system at the centre of the green line, and forms part of an interchange with the Red Line. It is situated around the corner from the northbound O'Connell - GPO Luas stop and the Red line's Abbey Street Luas stop.

References

Luas Green Line stops in Dublin (city)
Railway stations opened in 2017
2017 establishments in Ireland
Railway stations in the Republic of Ireland opened in the 21st century